Olympic Airways Flight 830 was a domestic scheduled passenger flight in Greece from Athens to Kozani with a stop in Larisa.

Accident
When the aircraft was unable to land at Larissa due to bad weather it elected to fly directly to Kozani at an altitude of 5500 ft. The last radio contact was at 09:45 when the pilot reported he was about 15 nm South of Kozani on a heading of 318 degrees, he was given the weather forecast. At 10:19 with nothing heard from the aircraft the airport declared an emergency and it was discovered that Flight 830 had flown into a mountain at a height of 4265 ft near the village of Servia, the mountains were covered in cloud.

Investigation
Investigation showed that the aircraft was on a heading of 310 degrees when it first struck the ground, it disintegrated over the next 200 metres before becoming shortly airborne again, finally crashing at the foot of another hill. Fire had broken out after the initial impact and continued to burn for several hours destroying the aircraft. At the accident site the mountain above 3000 ft were covered in cloud.

Aircraft
The aircraft was a twin-engined NAMC YS-11A turboprop airliner registered SX-BBR with construction number 2156, it first flew on 12 April 1971 in Japan and was delivered to Olympic Airways on 28 April 1971.

References
Notes

Bibliography

External links
 AviationSafety Network report

Aviation accidents and incidents in 1976
Aviation accidents and incidents in Greece
Accidents and incidents involving the NAMC YS-11
Airliner accidents and incidents involving controlled flight into terrain
1976 in Greece
830
November 1976 events in Europe